A Brief Vacation is a 1973 melodrama film directed by Vittorio De Sica. The screenplay, written by Cesare Zavattini, was inspired by an Apollinaire adage ("Sickness is the vacation of the poor").

Synopsis
The film concerns a female factory worker from Calabria who falls ill on the job and is prescribed a stay at a mountain retreat. She goes despite her husband's wishes, leaving behind her thankless work shift and her frustrating in-laws, but also her three children.  The film addresses issues such as the health care system, labor conditions, spousal satisfaction, and class struggle.

Cast
 Florinda Bolkan as Clara Mataro
 Renato Salvatori as Franco Mataro, the husband
 Daniel Quenaud as Luigi, Clara's lover
 José María Prada as Dr. Ciranni
 Teresa Gimpera as Gina
 Hugo Blanco as brother-in-law
 Julia Peña as Edvige
 Miranda Campa as Nurse Guidotti
 Angela Cardile as the redhead
 Anna Carena as mother-in-law
 Monica Guerritore as Maria
 Maria Mizar as Nurse Garin
 Alessandro Romanazzi as son
 Adriana Asti as Scanziani
 Christian De Sica as Mariani

Critical reception
The film was nominated for Best Foreign Language Film by the U.S. National Board of Review.

Florinda Bolkan won the inaugural Best Actress prize from the Los Angeles Film Critics Association for her performance.

References

External links
 
 

1973 films
1973 romantic drama films
1970s Italian films
1970s Italian-language films
1970s Spanish films
Films directed by Vittorio De Sica
Films scored by Manuel De Sica
Films shot in Milan
Films with screenplays by Cesare Zavattini
Italian romantic drama films
Spanish romantic drama films